Gopher Glacier is a glacier descending from Christoffersen Heights and draining north between Bonnabeau Dome and Anderson Dome, in the Jones Mountains of Antarctica. It was mapped and named by the University of Minnesota Jones Mountains Party, 1960–61; "Gopher" is the nickname of the University of Minnesota and of the State.

See also
 List of glaciers in the Antarctic
 Glaciology

References

 

Glaciers of Ellsworth Land